Blue Love may refer to:

Blue Love (album), a 2003 album by Antique
"Blue Love" (song), a 1988 song by The O'Kanes
"Blue Love (In My Heart)", a 1956 song by Hank Williams
"Blue Love", a song by Rufus and Chaka Khan from Street Player